The 2022 Explore the Pocono Mountains 225 was the 19th stock car race of the 2022 NASCAR Xfinity Series, and the seventh iteration of the event. The race was held on Saturday, July 23, 2022, in Long Pond, Pennsylvania at Pocono Raceway, a  permanent triangular-shaped racetrack. The race took the scheduled 90 laps to complete. Noah Gragson, driving for JR Motorsports, held off Ty Gibbs in an outstanding battle with 22 laps to go, and earned his eighth career NASCAR Xfinity Series win, and his third of the season. Gragson would also dominate most of the race, leading 43 laps. To fill out the podium, Josh Berry, driving for JR Motorsports, would finish 3rd, respectively.

The race was marred by a wreck on lap 45. Santino Ferrucci would get spun coming out of turn 3. Ricky Stenhouse Jr., with nowhere to go, would t-bone the side of Ferrucci's car. Stenhouse came back down onto the racetrack, as everyone was attempting to make it through the wreck. Jeb Burton had attempted to go lower down the track to avoid the wreck, but was unsuccessful. Burton would clip the front of Stenhouse's car, causing him to flip on his roof, in turn becoming the 500th confirmed flip in NASCAR history. His car would come to rest right after the start-finish line. Ronnie Bassett Jr. and Jeremy Clements would also be involved in the crash. All drivers were released from the infield care center several minutes later.

Background 
Pocono Raceway (formerly Pocono International Raceway), also known as The Tricky Triangle, is a superspeedway located in the Pocono Mountains in Long Pond, Pennsylvania. It is the site of three NASCAR national series races and an ARCA Menards Series event in July: a NASCAR Cup Series race with support events by the NASCAR Xfinity Series and NASCAR Camping World Truck Series. From 1971 to 1989, and from 2013 to 2019, the track also hosted an Indy Car race, currently sanctioned by the IndyCar Series. Additionally, from 1982 to 2021, it hosted two NASCAR Cup Series races, with the traditional first date being removed for 2022.

Pocono is one of the few NASCAR tracks not owned by either NASCAR or Speedway Motorsports, the dominant track owners in NASCAR. Pocono CEO Nick Igdalsky and president Ben May are members of the family-owned Mattco Inc, started by Joseph II and Rose Mattioli.  Mattco also owns South Boston Speedway in South Boston, Virginia.

Outside NASCAR and IndyCar Series races, Pocono is used throughout the year by the Stock Car Experience, Bertil Roos Driving School, Sports Car Club of America (SCCA) as well as many other clubs and organizations. The triangular track also has three separate infield sections of racetrack – the north course, east course and south course. Each of these infield sections use separate portions of the track or can be combined for longer and more technical course configurations. In total Pocono Raceway has offers 22 different road course configurations ranging from .5 miles to 3.65 miles in length. During regular non-race weekends, multiple clubs or driving schools can use the track simultaneously by running on different infield sections. All of the infield sections can also be run in either clockwise or counter clockwise direction which doubles the 22 course configuration to 44 total course options.

Entry list

Practice 
The only 30-minute practice session was held on Saturday, July 23, at 9:30 AM EST.

Qualifying 
Qualifying was held on Saturday, July 23, at 10:00 AM EST. Since Pocono Raceway is a tri-oval track, the qualifying system used is a single-car, single-lap system with only one round. Whoever sets the fastest time in the round wins the pole.

Race results 
Stage 1 Laps: 20

Stage 2 Laps: 20

Stage 3 Laps: 50

Standings after the race 

Drivers' Championship standings

Note: Only the first 12 positions are included for the driver standings.

References 

2022 NASCAR Xfinity Series
NASCAR races at Pocono Raceway
Explore the Pocono Mountains 225
2022 in sports in Pennsylvania